Jonathan Gray (born 24 August 1980 in Cannes, France) is a French-American film and TV producer, and a serial entrepreneur. He is the founder and CEO of The Hideaway Entertainment, an independent film and TV production company based in Beverly Hills, California.

Biography 
Gray is the son of French-American Holocaust survivor and writer Martin Gray. He attended the Carnot high school in Cannes, with a literature-focused curriculum, and then attended the SKEMA Business School in Sophia Antipolis.

At 16 years old, he worked for Disney to welcome stars in Cannes and organize their stay. At the age of 20, Jonathan Gray became the assistant of a real estate developer in Southern France. From 2003 to 2019, he founded and managed his own events company, JG Events, specialized in luxury private and corporate events. In 2005, he launched a real estate company specialized in high-end properties on the Côte d'azur. In 2007, the company merged with the London-based real estate broker Beauchamp Estates, making Jonathan Gray co-owner of the company and its exclusive representative in France. He sold the Château Miraval to Brad Pitt and Angelina Jolie, the Villa les Cèdres in Saint-Jean-Cap-Ferrat, and La Belle Époque in Monaco.

From 2005 to 2009, Jonathan Gray was also the founder and managing director of the French subsidiary of the high-end concierge service Quintessentially. In 2008, he founded First Idea International Ltd., a strategic and investment consultancy with a focus on developing post-oil economic solutions in the Middle East.

In 2017, Gray launched the independent film production company The Hideaway Entertainment, marking the start of his career as a producer. With The Hideaway Entertainment, Jonathan Gray was involved in the production of the films Mile 22 (2018), Men in Black: International (2019), Bloodshot (2020), and Cherry (2021).

In 2019, Jonathan Gray launched the company Intelligent Design Agency (iDeA) which develops "idea-first" technologies for large scale projects, including Saudi Arabia's futurist city Neom.

Filmography

References

External links 
 Jonathan Gray at IMDb
 Official website

1980 births
Living people
French film producers
American film producers
American film production company founders
American independent film production company founders
Businesspeople in real estate